The 2009–10 NCAA Division I men's basketball season began on November 9, 2009, and ended with the 2010 NCAA Division I men's basketball tournament's championship game on April 5, 2010, on the Lucas Oil Stadium in Indianapolis. The opening round occurred on Tuesday, March 16, 2010, followed by first and second rounds on Thursday through Sunday, March 18–21, 2010. Regional games were played on Thursday through Sunday, March 25–28, 2010, with the Final Four played on Saturday and Monday, April 3 and 5, 2010.

Season headlines 
 The Duke Blue Devils and head coach Mike Krzyzewski won their fourth national championship, defeating upstart Butler 61–59 behind their "big three" of Jon Scheyer, Kyle Singler and Nolan Smith. The game was played in Butler's home town of Indianapolis.
 Krzyzewski became the third coach in NCAA history to win four championships, joining John Wooden (10) and Adolph Rupp (4).
 Kentucky became the first college team to reach the 2000 win mark by defeating Drexel 88–44 on December 21. North Carolina became the second with a win over Miami on March 2. Kansas became the third with a win over Texas Tech on March 11.
 Arkansas sophomore guard Rotnei Clarke set an SEC record by hitting 13 three-pointers in a game in the Razorbacks' November 13 season opener against Alcorn State. Clarke connected on 13 of 17 three-pointers and finished the game with 51 points. Clarke's 51 points was an Arkansas school record, while his 13 threes was good for fifth in NCAA history.
 Prior to the season the NCAA announced that Memphis would serve three years' probation and would vacate their record-setting 38-win 2007–08 season due to a fraudulent SAT score by star Derrick Rose and extra benefits given to Rose's brother under then-coach John Calipari. Memphis appealed the decision. The NCAA rejected the appeal during the NCAA tournament.
 Binghamton University dismissed six players on September 25, following the arraignment of Emanuel "Tiki" Mayben on charges of cocaine distribution. The move left Binghamton with only seven scholarship players for the 2009–10 season and included the dismissal of star guard D.J. Rivera. Coach Kevin Broadus was placed on administrative leave and assistant Mark Macon served as interim coach.
 The preseason AP All-American team was named on November 2. Luke Harangody of Notre Dame (57 votes), Cole Aldrich (49) and Sherron Collins (39) of Kansas, Patrick Patterson of Kentucky (35) and Kyle Singler of Duke (30) were tabbed.
 Utah Valley gained full Division I status after a seven-year provisional period where they played a D1 schedule. This move was the first time that a school had moved to D1 directly from the NJCAA. Other schools to officially gain Division I status include Kennesaw State, NJIT and North Florida.
 The Great West Conference began league play in 2009–10 as the 32nd Division I conference.
 Notre Dame forward Luke Harangody surpassed both the 2000-point and 1000-rebound marks during the season, becoming the first Fighting Irish player to do so.
 Mercer guard James Florence, South Carolina guard Devan Downey, Maryland guard Greivis Vásquez, San Francisco forward Dior Lowhorn, Morgan State guard Reggie Holmes, Western Michigan guard David Kool, West Virginia forward Da'Sean Butler, Villanova guard Scottie Reynolds, Cornell forward Ryan Wittman and Duke guard Jon Scheyer surpassed the 2,000 point mark during the season.
 Syracuse coach Jim Boeheim became the eighth Division I coach to win 800 games when the Orange defeated Albany 75–43 on November 9.
 Tom Penders became the eighth head coach in NCAA history to lead four different schools to the NCAA Tournament when he coached the Houston Cougars to the Conference USA tournament title. Penders had previously led Rhode Island, Texas and George Washington to NCAA tournament berths.
 In November, Evan Turner became the 34th player to record multiple triple doubles in a season. Over the course of the 2009–10 Big Ten season, he became the first player to finish in the top two in average points (1st, 20.4), rebounds (2nd, 9.2) and assists (2nd, 6.0) in Big Ten Conference history. Along the way, he broke and rebroke Big Ten records for single-season (7) and career (10) Player of the week awards.
 On February 22, Cole Aldrich was named the men's college basketball Academic All-American of the year.
 On February 24, Mississippi State's Jarvis Varnado became the NCAA's all-time leading shot-blocker.
 On February 27, a contest between then-no. 4 Syracuse and then-no. 8 Villanova set the NCAA on-campus basketball attendance record, with 34,616 spectators packing the Carrier Dome. The Wildcats fell to the Orange, 95–77.
 The rise and fall of Texas. Ranked in the top three from the beginning of the season until mid-January, including two weeks at #1, they were considered national title contenders. But they fell out of the top 25 less than two months later, lost two starters (Doğuş Balbay and Varez Ward) to season-ending injuries, and lost in the opening round of the NCAA tournament.
 On April 1, Deon Thompson of North Carolina appeared in the NIT Championship game, giving him 152 career game appearances. This set the NCAA all-time career games played mark, formerly held by Wayne Turner of Kentucky and Walter Hodge of Florida.
 Third-year coach Tommy Amaker leads Harvard to its most wins in school history (21) behind the play of rare Harvard NBA player Jeremy Lin.

Major rule changes 
Beginning in 2009–10, the following rules changes were implemented:
 The NCAA reduced the amount of time that college underclassmen can test the waters for the NBA draft and still retain their college eligibility. As of this season, players have until early May (rather than mid-June) to decide to return.
 Secondary defenders must now establish their position outside of the zone between the backboard and the front of the rim to draw a charge.
 If a player is injured and unable to shoot his own foul shots, the replacement shooter must be chosen from the players currently on the court.
 Instant replay may now be used to determine flagrant fouls.

Season outlook

Pre-season polls 

The top 25 from the AP and ESPN/USA Today Coaches Polls, October 29, 2009. Collegeinsider.com released the preseason Mid-Major Top 25 poll on November 3. This poll is meant to recognize the top teams outside of major conferences.

Conference membership changes 

These schools joined new conferences for the 2009–10 season.

Regular season

Early-season tournaments 

*Although these tournaments include more teams, only 4 play for the championship.

Conference winners and tournaments 
Thirty athletic conferences each end their regular seasons with a single-elimination tournament. The teams in each conference that win their regular season title are given the number one seed in each tournament. The winners of these tournaments receive automatic invitations to the 2010 NCAA Division I men's basketball tournament. The Ivy League does not have a conference tournament, instead giving their automatic invitation to their regular-season champion. The Great West Conference began play in 2009–10 and does not receive an automatic bid to the NCAA Tournament.

Statistical leaders

Conference standings

Postseason tournaments

NCAA tournament 

The NCAA Tournament tipped off on March 16, 2010, with the opening round game in Dayton, Ohio, and concluded on April 5 at the Lucas Oil Stadium in Indianapolis. Of the 65 teams that were invited to participate, 31 were automatic bids while 34 were at-large bids. The 34 at-large teams came from 11 conferences, with the Big East receiving the most bids – eight. The tournament was marked by a number of significant upsets. The biggest saw Northern Iowa knock off #1 overall seed Kansas 69–67 on an Ali Farokhmanesh three-pointer in the waning seconds. Another surprise was Ivy League champion Cornell making a surprise run to the Sweet 16 – becoming the first Ivy school to win an NCAA tournament game since 1998.
Duke made a big run in the NCAA tournament, defeating Arkansas Pine-Bluff (73–44), California (68–53), Purdue (70–57), and Baylor (78–72) in their region. In the semifinals, the Blue Devils routed West Virginia 78–57 to make their 10th championship game appearance. In the end, Duke defeated surprise finalist Butler 61–59, after a three-point attempt by the Bulldogs' Gordon Hayward barely missed at the buzzer. Duke claimed its fourth National title as Blue Devil forward Kyle Singler was named Most Outstanding Player

Final Four – Lucas Oil Stadium, Indianapolis, Indiana

Tournament upsets 
A "major upset" is defined as a win by a team seeded 7 or more spots below its defeated opponent.

National Invitation tournament 

After the NCAA Tournament field was announced, the National Invitation Tournament invited 32 teams to participate. There was much speculation during the NIT that the NCAA Tournament would expand to 96 teams and that 2010 could be the last NIT after 73 years. (Ultimately, the NCAA decided to expand only to 68 teams, keeping the NIT intact for the near future.) Dayton defeated defending National Champion North Carolina 79–68 in the Final on April 1. The Flyers' Chris Johnson was named tournament Most Outstanding Player.

NIT Semifinals and Final 
Played at Madison Square Garden in New York City

College Basketball Invitational 

The second College Basketball Invitational (CBI) Tournament was held beginning March 16 and ended with a best-of-three final, ending March 31. VCU defeated Saint Louis 2–0 in the final series to win the title. The Rams' Joey Rodriguez was named tournament MVP.

CollegeInsider.com tournament 

The CollegeInsider.com Postseason Tournament was held beginning March 16 and ended with a championship game on March 30. This tournament places an emphasis on selecting successful teams from "mid-major" conferences who were left out of the NCAA Tournament and NIT. Missouri State defeated Pacific 78–65 to win the CIT championship in Springfield, Missouri. The Bears' Will Creekmore was named tournament MVP.

Award winners

Consensus All-American teams

Major player of the year awards 
 Wooden Award: Evan Turner, Ohio State
 Naismith Award: Evan Turner, Ohio State
 Associated Press Player of the Year: Evan Turner, Ohio State
 NABC Player of the Year: Evan Turner, Ohio State
 Oscar Robertson Trophy (USBWA): Evan Turner, Ohio State
 Adolph Rupp Trophy: John Wall, Kentucky
 Sporting News Player of the Year: Evan Turner, Ohio State

Major freshman of the year awards 
 USBWA Freshman of the Year: John Wall, Kentucky
 Sporting News Freshman of the Year: John Wall, Kentucky

Major coach of the year awards 
 Associated Press Coach of the Year: Jim Boeheim, Syracuse
 Henry Iba Award (USBWA): Jim Boeheim, Syracuse
 NABC Coach of the Year: Jim Boeheim, Syracuse
 Naismith College Coach of the Year: Jim Boeheim, Syracuse
 Adolph Rupp Cup: John Calipari, Kentucky
 Sporting News Coach of the Year: Jim Boeheim, Syracuse

Other major awards 
 Bob Cousy Award (Best point guard): Greivis Vásquez, Maryland
 Pete Newell Big Man Award (Best big man): Greg Monroe, Georgetown
 NABC Defensive Player of the Year: Jarvis Varnado, Mississippi State
 Frances Pomeroy Naismith Award (Best player 6'0"/1.83 m or shorter): Sherron Collins, Kansas
 Lowe's Senior CLASS Award (top senior): Da'Sean Butler, West Virginia
 Robert V. Geasey Trophy (Top player in Philadelphia Big 5): Scottie Reynolds, Villanova
 NIT/Haggerty Award (Top player in New York City metro area): Charles Jenkins, Hofstra
 Elite 88 Award (Top GPA among upperclass players at Final Four): Matt Howard, Butler
 Chip Hilton Player of the Year Award (Strong personal character): Román Martínez, New Mexico

CollegeInsider.com awards 
 Ben Jobe Award (Top minority coach): Ed Cooley, Fairfield
 Hugh Durham Award (Top mid-major coach): Mike Young, Wofford
 Jim Phelan Award (Top head coach): Jamie Dixon, Pittsburgh
 Lefty Driesell Award (Top defensive player): Jarvis Varnado, Mississippi State
 Lou Henson Award (Top mid-major player): Keith Benson, Oakland
 Lute Olson Award (Top non-freshman or transfer player): Sherron Collins, Kansas
 Skip Prosser Man of the Year Award (Coach with moral character): Bob Marlin, Sam Houston State

Coaching changes 
A number of teams changed coaches throughout the season and after the season ended.

References